Walter Irving Brown (April 23, 1915 – February 3, 1991) was a professional baseball pitcher. He played part of the 1947 season in Major League Baseball for the St. Louis Browns. His minor league baseball career spanned 18 seasons, from 1936 until 1953.

External links

Major League Baseball pitchers
St. Louis Browns players
Daytona Beach Islanders players
Union Springs Springs players
Columbus Red Birds players
Kilgore Boomers players
Clarksdale Red Sox players
Portsmouth Red Birds players
Oklahoma City Indians players
Salina Millers players
Memphis Chickasaws players
Toledo Mud Hens players
St. Hyacinthe Saints players
San Antonio Missions players
St. Hyacinthe A's players
Baseball players from New York (state)
1915 births
1991 deaths